The Edmond–Ogston model is a thermodynamic model proposed by Elizabeth Edmond and Alexander George Ogston in 1968 to describe phase separation of two-component polymer mixtures in a common solvent. At the core of the model is an expression for the Helmholtz free energy 

 

Here  is the molar concentration of polymer ,  is the universal gas constant,  is the absolute temperature,  is the system volume. It is possible to obtain explicit solutions for the coordinates of the critical point 

 ,

where  represents the slope of the binodal and spinodal in the critical point.

 ,

The spinodal can be expressed analytically too, and the Lambert W function has a central role to express the coordinates of binodal and tie-lines.

The model is closely related to the Flory–Huggins model.

References 

Polymer chemistry
Solutions
Thermodynamic free energy